The 2022 X League season was the inaugural season of the Extreme Football League (commonly known as the XLeague) in the United States. It began in June and concluded in September with the Chicago Blitz winning the inaugural "X Cup" championship game. The league had most recently operated in 2019, branded as the Legends Football League (LFL).

Season summary
The inaugural X-League season was shortened, with each team's regular season reduced from four games to two. The truncated season kicked off on June 10, with a match between the Chicago Blitz and Kansas City Force. Preferring a matchup between two capable teams instead of a one-sided contest between a more-established team (the Blitz succeeded the Chicago Bliss, four-time LFL champions) and a team of rookies (the Force were created after the Nashville Knights were suspended from the league), the league decided to replace the Force roster with coaches and players from the Atlanta Empire; Chicago won and Kansas City was assessed the loss while Atlanta personnel returned to the Empire.

The Arizona Red Devils, another new team in the league, suspended operations in June without playing any games. Their scheduled contest against Kansas City was canceled, and a squad from Mexico took their place in a contest against the Los Angeles Black Storm; Los Angeles won, 48–8, in the final game of the regular season on August 13.

The season saw two major upsets as the Empire defeated the top-ranked Austin Sound on July 9, 50–34, and the Chicago Blitz upset the Seattle Thunder (successors to the 2019 LFL champion Seattle Mist) on August 6, 34–28.

Postseason
The playoffs saw Atlanta (2–0) seeded first, Chicago (2–0) second, Seattle (1–1) third, and Austin (1–1) fourth; point differential was used as a tie-breaker. On August 27, Atlanta survived Austin, 34–32, while Chicago held off Seattle, 34–33. The season concluded on September 10 with the newly restructured league's first-ever "X Cup" ending in a 19–12 victory for the Chicago Blitz over the Atlanta Empire.

Schedule

Regular season

Notes:
 In week 1, Kansas City was represented by players from the Atlanta Empire.
 In week 9, Arizona was originally scheduled to face Los Angeles.

Source:

Standings
At completion of the regular season

 Team qualified for postseason

Source:

Post-season

References

Further reading

External links
 Beyond The Game: Road to X Cup 2022 via YouTube
 Highlights of X Cup 2022 via YouTube

2022 in American football